Mylothris splendens is a butterfly in the family Pieridae. It is found in the forests of Madagascar.

References

Butterflies described in 1927
Pierini
Endemic fauna of Madagascar
Butterflies of Africa